Curdton is an unincorporated community in Stoddard County, in the U.S. state of Missouri.

History
A post office called Curdton was established in 1899, and remained in operation until 1910. The community was named after Sam Curd, an early citizen.

References

Unincorporated communities in Stoddard County, Missouri
Unincorporated communities in Missouri
1899 establishments in Missouri